Cho Mun-chu (born 29 July 1964) is a South Korean basketball player. She competed in the women's tournament at the 1988 Summer Olympics.

References

External links
 

1964 births
Living people
South Korean women's basketball players
Olympic basketball players of South Korea
Basketball players at the 1988 Summer Olympics
Basketball players from Seoul
Asian Games medalists in basketball
Basketball players at the 1986 Asian Games
Basketball players at the 1990 Asian Games
Asian Games gold medalists for South Korea
Asian Games silver medalists for South Korea
Medalists at the 1986 Asian Games
Medalists at the 1990 Asian Games